Shinin' On is the eighth studio album by American rock band Grand Funk Railroad. The album was released in March 1974, by Capitol Records. Although not as successful as its predecessor, We're an American Band (1973), it peaked at #5 in the US and was certified gold, and its first single, a cover of "The Loco-Motion" topped the U.S. charts. The original cover was done in bi-visual 3-D and included the required blue and red lensed glasses to view it. A Quadraphonic mix of the album was available in the Quadraphonic 8-Track cartridge format. The title song was featured in The Simpsons 7th season episode "Homerpalooza" on May 19, 1996.

Track listing

Personnel
Grand Funk Railroad
 Mark Farner – guitar, guitarrón, harmonica, organ, vocals
 Craig Frost – organ, clavinet, moog, piano, mellotron, backing vocals
 Mel Schacher – bass
 Don Brewer – drums, percussion, vocals

Additional and technical personnel
 Todd Rundgren – producer, additional guitar, backing vocals
 David Lesage – recording engineer

ChartsAlbumSingles'

References

1974 albums
Grand Funk Railroad albums
Albums produced by Todd Rundgren
Capitol Records albums